The Stone Roses is a 1959 spy thriller novel by the British writer Sarah Gainham. It is set in Prague shortly after the Communist coup in Czechoslovakia.

Synopsis
In 1948 an agent goes missing in Czechoslovakia, British spy Toby Elyat is sent in under cover as a newspaper reporter to try and locate him. Before long he is entangled with the operatives of the Soviet intelligence agency MGB.

References

Bibliography
 Burton, Alan. Historical Dictionary of British Spy Fiction. Rowman & Littlefield, 2016.
 Reilly, John M. Twentieth Century Crime & Mystery Writers. Springer, 2015.

1959 British novels
Novels by Sarah Gainham
British thriller novels
British spy novels
Novels set in Prague
Novels set in the 1940s
Eyre & Spottiswoode books